Dorcadion piochardi is a species of beetle in the family Cerambycidae. It was described by Kraatz in 1873. It is known from Turkey.

Varietas
 Dorcadion piochardi var. apicedisparatum Breuning, 1946
 Dorcadion piochardi var. ladikense Breuning & Villiers, 1967
 Dorcadion piochardi var. pelops Jakovlev, 1901
 Dorcadion piochardi var. roberti Pic, 1905

References

piochardi
Beetles described in 1873